Take It Home is Canadian singer Tom Cochrane's sixth solo studio album and second album for Universal Music Canada, released on February 10, 2015.  Cochrane wrote all of the album with the exception of Sunday Afternoon Hang which he co-wrote with Danielle Bourjeaurd.

Track listing

References

2015 albums
Tom Cochrane albums
Universal Records albums
Albums recorded at Metalworks Studios